Ambrose Lake is a lake in Thunder Bay District, Ontario, Canada. The primary outflow is an unnamed creek to the Whitesand River, between Longcanoe Lake and Hornblende Lake.

References

Lakes of Thunder Bay District